Juan Píriz (17 May 1902 – 23 March 1946) was a Uruguayan footballer who played as a defender. He was part of the Uruguayan team which won gold medal at 1928 Olympics.

References

External links
profile

1902 births
1946 deaths
Uruguayan footballers
Footballers at the 1928 Summer Olympics
Olympic footballers of Uruguay
Olympic gold medalists for Uruguay
Uruguay international footballers
Defensor Sporting players
Club Nacional de Football players
Olympic medalists in football
Medalists at the 1928 Summer Olympics
Association football midfielders